Count Adolph Sigfried von der Osten (21 October 1726, Denmark - 2 January 1797) was a Danish diplomat of German descent. His father was Jacob Frants von der Osten (died 1739), whose family was Pomeranian. Adolph was born in Denmark and backed Danish nationalism. Christian VI of Denmark paid for him to travel abroad and he was cared for by Carl Adolph von Plessen when young. In 1783 he was made a knight of the Order of the Elephant.

1726 births
1797 deaths
18th-century Danish diplomats
Danish nationalists
Danish people of German descent
Danish Customs Service personnel